Andy "Frank" Wright  is an Australian supervising sound editor. He is known for his work on the war-drama film Hacksaw Ridge directed by Mel Gibson, for which he received two Academy Award nominations at the 89th Academy Awards, Best Sound Editing and winning Best Sound Mixing (both shared with Robert Mackenzie).

Awards

 Won: Academy Award for Best Sound Mixing
 Won: Satellite Award for Best Sound
 Nominated: Academy Award for Best Sound Editing 
 Nominated: BAFTA Award for Best Sound
 Nominated: Cinema Audio Society Award for Outstanding Achievement in Sound Mixing for a Motion Picture – Live Action

References

External links
 Andy Wright at Sound Firm 
 

Living people
Australian audio engineers
Year of birth missing (living people)
Australian sound editors
Best Sound Mixing Academy Award winners